The Rappers Delight Club is a rotating group of American elementary and middle school rappers from Silver Spring, Maryland. The group is most notable for their appearance in British funk/rock band The Go! Team’s second album, Proof of Youth, on the song "Universal Speech".

History
The Rappers Delight Club is named after the Sugar Hill Gang song,  "Rapper's Delight". It is also the name of a learn-to-rap project taught at Glenallan Elementary School as part of an after-school program led by high school teacher David Goldberg and audio engineer Joseph Mitra. The group ranges from ages five to twelve. They all write their own material and rap over music samples that are used as the backbone for their raps. The group members rap about kid-related topics such as soccer, football, playing on the playground, shopping, etc.

The group has sampled music from Sufjan Stevens, Jens Lekman, The Go! Team and the theme music from Sesame Street's segment Elmo's World. They appeared in The Go! Team’s "Universal Speech" in 2007 for their second album, Proof of Youth, which they recorded their own remix later. In 2009, the group recorded "I Don't Wanna Grow Up...Yet", sampling singer-songwriter Tom Waits' "I Don't Wanna Grow Up" from his 1992 album Bone Machine.

Discography

Songs
"You'd Better Ask Somebody", 2010
"I Don't Wanna Grow Up...Yet", 2009
"Universal Speech" (with The Go! Team), 2007
"Universal Speech (RDC Remix)", 2007
"Tick Tock", 2006
"We’re Not Done", 2006
"Hum", 2006
"When We Were Kids", 2006 (versions 1 and 2)
"First Ladies Anthem", 2006

References

External links
The Rappers Delight Club at MySpace

American hip hop groups
Child musical groups
Musical groups from Maryland
Musical groups established in 2006
American children's musical groups
Education in Maryland